Kevin Sheppard (born 17 September 1979 in St Croix) is a United States Virgin Islands basketball player and former football striker. He became the subject of the documentary The Iran Job which covers his 2008-2009 season with the A.S. Shiraz team in Iran.

Soccer career
Sheppard played soccer as well as basketball at Jacksonville University. He made his debut for the United States Virgin Islands in an August 2002 CONCACAF Gold Cup qualification match against the Dominican Republic and also played in the return game.

Basketball
Sheppard chose to pursue a professional career in basketball and played in Venezuela, Israel, Poland, Spain, Argentina, the United States, and Puerto Rico before joining Iranian team Azad University in Tehran. Sheppard is the subject of a documentary, The Iran Job, which covers his 2008-2009 season with the A.S. Shiraz team in Iran.

See also
 List of top international men's football goalscorers by country
 The Iran Job

References and notes

External links
 Understanding Iran: U.S. athlete reveals his inside story, CNN, December 23, 2011
 An Unlikely U.S. Diplomat Scores with Iranian Fans, The Washington Post, Dec. 23, 2011

1979 births
Living people
Basketball players at the 2007 Pan American Games
Jacksonville Dolphins men's basketball players
Maccabi Rishon LeZion basketball players
Pan American Games competitors for the United States Virgin Islands
People from Saint Croix, U.S. Virgin Islands
Piratas de Quebradillas players
United States Virgin Islands men's basketball players
United States Virgin Islands expatriate sportspeople
United States Virgin Islands soccer players
Association football forwards
Maratonistas de Coamo players
American men's basketball players
Jacksonville Dolphins men's soccer players
Point guards
United States Virgin Islands international soccer players